W. Patrick McCray (born 1967) is a historian at the University of California, Santa Barbara. He researches, writes about, and teaches the history of science and the history of technology.

Life 
McCray grew up in rural southwestern Pennsylvania and later attended graduate school at the University of Arizona where he completed a Ph.D. in 1996. He is the author or editor of several books on the history of science and technology; topics include the effects of technology on astronomical practice, the activities of amateur scientists during the Cold War, and the activities of scientists who promoted radical visions for the technological future. More recently, McCray has studied and written about the interactions between art and technology. A new book, called Making Art Work, appeared in 2020 and documents interactions between engineers and artists from the 1960s to the present.

Prior to this, in his 2013 book The Visioneers, McCray presented the concept of "visioneer" as historical actor. As he defined it, the term is a portmanteau that refers to individuals (often with a science or engineering background) who imagined, designed, and built exploratory technologies. The Visioneers won the 2014 Watson Davis and Helen Miles Davis Prize Watson Davis and Helen Miles Davis Prize from the History of Science Society.

In 2005, McCray co-founded the Center for Nanotechnology in Society  with a grant from the National Science Foundation. Until 2016, he led a research group focusing on the history of nanotechnology. In 2011, he was elected a Fellow of the American Association for the Advancement of Science and, in 2013, of the American Physical Society.  In 2016 and 2017, McCray was a "Faculty Expert" and speaker for the World Economic Forum's meeting in Davos, Switzerland.

Works 

Glassmaking in Renaissance Venice, 1999, Ashgate. 
Giant Telescopes: Astronomical Ambitions and the Promise of Technology, 2004, Harvard University Press. 
Keep Watching the Skies: The Story of Operation Moonwatch and the Dawn of the Space Age, 2008, Princeton University Press.
 The Visioneers. How a Group of Elite Scientists Pursued Space Colonies, Nanotechnologies, and a Limitless Future. 2012, Princeton University Press, .
 Groovy Science: Knowledge, Innovation, and American Counterculture, co-edited with David Kaiser, 2016, University of Chicago Press, 
 Making Art Work: How Cold War Engineers and Artists Forged a New Creative Culture, 2020, MIT Press.

References

External links
 UCSB Home page
 Google Scholar page
 2016 Davos talk on "Industrial Revolutions"
 2017 Davos panel on "Maintaining Innovation"

21st-century American historians
21st-century American male writers
Living people
1967 births
University of California, Santa Barbara faculty
American male non-fiction writers